Straits Air Freight Express (SAFE) was a cargo airline, established in 1950, named for its Cook Strait focus and connecting the North Island and South Islands of New Zealand's railway systems from the 1950s to the 1970s. The company was renamed Safe Air Limited in 1966 and diversified into aviation maintenance. In 1972 it was bought by the National Airways Corporation, which then merged with Air New Zealand. Safe Air continued to be operated as an independent entity by both owners. It ceased flying in 1990, but has continued to expand as a maintenance facility and now employs approximately 350 staff. In 2015 it was bought by the Australian arm of Airbus.

Rail Air
In 1947, New Zealand Railways Department (NZR) and the Royal New Zealand Air Force began flying between Paraparaumu and Blenheim with a service that came to be known as Rail Air. SAFE took over the service from the RNZAF in 1950. Much of NZR's inter-island freight moved to its new Inter-island rail ferry service from 1962 with the introduction of the GMV Aramoana, but the Rail Air service survived until December 1983.

Fleet
The main aircraft type that the company operated was the Bristol Type 170 Freighter Mk.31. The first two examples were delivered in mid-1951. The "cargon" system was designed in-house – a wheeled metal pallet and transfer system using modified railway flatcars to allow trucked loads to be transferred directly into the nose doorway of the tail-wheeled aircraft. This reduced the turn-around time of flights to about 15 minutes. 53,777 tons were carried between Woodbourne and Papaparaumu in 1961/62, but declined 25% next year, when Aramoana started the Interislander. The route closed in 1983. Eleven Bristol 170s were still in operation with SAFE in 1977.

The company also operated two larger Armstrong Whitworth AW.650 Argosy four-engined turbine propeller freighter aircraft from the 1970s.

Chatham Islands Passenger Services
New Zealand's most eastern islands, the Chatham Islands were linked with the main islands of New Zealand with combined air freight and passenger service using a unique removable passenger pod that was placed into the hold of their Bristol Freighter aircraft. Extra sound insulation was used to drown out the Bristol's Hercules engines and earplugs were provided. Windows in the pod lined up with those in the fuselage. The flight time was approximately three hours.

In 1982 when the paved runway at Tu-uta Point was built, Argosy aircraft were placed into the Chathams' route with a more comfortable passenger pod based on the cabin of a Boeing 737. The pod still exists today, placed in the hold of ZK-SAE on static display at Blenheim. When flying operations ceased in 1990 Air New Zealand continued operations with other aircraft, Air Chathams was founded to keep the air route open when Air New Zealand pulled out in 1992.

See also
 List of defunct airlines of New Zealand
 History of aviation in New Zealand

References

Bibliography

External links

 As Safe Air Limited, SAFE is now a subsidiary of Air New Zealand Engineering
 Safe Air Limited's home page

Defunct airlines of New Zealand
Airlines established in 1950
Air New Zealand
Cook Strait